Eldoraigne is a residential suburb east of Centurion, Gauteng, South Africa.

References

Suburbs of Centurion, Gauteng